Marathon is a census-designated place (CDP) in Brewster County, Texas, United States. The population was 470 in 2007, after growing from 455 in 2000, but had decreased to 430 by 2010.

 Marathon services tourists traveling to Big Bend National Park.

History
In 2022 Joe Holley of the Houston Chronicle wrote that Marathon is "proud to be the un-Marfa."

Geography
Marathon is located at  (30.207529, -103.243258).

Demographics

2020 census

As of the 2020 United States census, there were 410 people, 217 households, and 174 families residing in the CDP.

2000 census
As of the census of 2000, there were 455 people, 198 households and 126 families residing in the CDP. The population density was 86.6 per square mile (33.5/km2). There were 287 housing units at an average density of 54.6/sq mi (21.1/km2). The racial makeup of the CDP was 82.42% White, 0.88% African American, 13.19% from other races, and 3.52% from two or more races. Hispanic or Latino of any race were 53.19% of the population.

There were 198 households, of which 24.2% had children under the age of 18 living with them, 48.5% were married couples living together, 8.1% had a female householder with no husband present, and 35.9% were non-families. 32.3% of all households were made up of individuals, and 13.1% had someone living alone who was 65 years of age or older. The average household size was 2.30 and the average family size was 2.87.

The age distribution was 21.1% under the age of 18, 9.2% from 18 to 24, 17.1% from 25 to 44, 33.2% from 45 to 64, and 19.3% who were 65 years of age or older. The median age was 46 years. For every 100 females, there were 104.0 males. For every 100 females age 18 and over, there were 108.7 males.

The median household income was $22,273, and the median family income was $27,500. Males had a median income of $22,500 versus $20,938 for females. The per capita income for the CDP was $17,884. About 13.2% of families and 23.2% of the population were below the poverty line, including 46.7% of those under age 18 and 13.9% of those age 65 or over.

Places of interest

The Gage Hotel, built in 1927 by architect Henry Trost, is a historic 45-room hotel. Beginning circa 1978 J. P. Bryan from Houston owned the hotel, which began catering to tourists heading to Big Bend and to Mexico. Bryan also acquired other buildings to further develop the town.

The town was also a filming location for the movie Paris, Texas directed by Wim Wenders.  The 1985 Kevin Costner film, Fandango, shot scenes in Marathon.

Transportation
Marathon is located at the junction of US 90 and US 385.

Education
Marathon is served by Marathon Independent School District for grades K-12.

Brewster County is within the Odessa College District for community college.

Government and infrastructure

Marathon Post Office is operated by the United States Postal Service.

Earthquake

On April 14, 1995, a 5.7-magnitude earthquake occurred near Marathon. As of 2008, this was the second-largest earthquake recorded in Texas.

Climate
According to the Köppen climate classification system, Marathon has a semiarid climate, BSk on climate maps.

Coordinates: 
Elevation:

See also

Marathon Uplift

References

External links

 Marathon Chamber of Commerce
 Marathon Museum Society
 West Texas Weekly is a local weekly newspaper.
 Marathon in Handbook of Texas
  - The earliest census map posted online, from 1990: 1990 COUNTY BLOCK MAP (RECREATED): Brewster County Page B - 2000 Map and 2010 Map

Census-designated places in Brewster County, Texas
Census-designated places in Texas
Former county seats in Texas